Tìm kiếm tài năng – Vietnam's Got Talent is a Vietnamese reality television talent show that features singers, dancers, magicians, comedians, martial-art players, performers with risky weapons/tools/elements, variety acts and other performers of all ages competing for a grand prize of 400,000,000 VND (approximately $20,000). The show was based on the Got Talent series format that originated by Simon Cowell in the United Kingdom. Its first season aired Sunday nights at 9:00PM (UTC+7) between 18 December 2011 and 6 May 2012 on VTV3 and MTV Vietnam.

The show is primarily produced by Vietnam Television and BHD Corp.

Seasons overview
Actor and comedian Thành Lộc was the first judge to be announced. Shortly thereafter, model and businesswoman Thúy Hạnh confirmed her role at the judges' table. Musician Huy Tuấn was given the third spot of the judges' table, while the fourth slot was filled by a new celebrity guest each week. The show was presented by actors Chi Bảo and Quyền Linh.

The first season ran for 26 episodes. The producers chose the top 360 auditioning acts for taped auditions. These were subsequently cut down to 140 by an additional round of auditions consisting of the traditional "Yes" and "No" vote by a panel of three judges. The judges then chose their favourite 49 acts for advancement into the live semi-final rounds, from which the top two acts of each semi-final advanced to two final rounds consisting of 7 acts each, from which 2 acts per final round, one by televote and one by judges' vote, advanced to a grand finale.

Season 1 (2011-12)

The first season of Vietnam's Got Talent premiered on 18 December 2011 and ended on 6 May 2012. It was broadcast on VTV3 and MTV Vietnam. The winner of the first season was the dancing couple Đăng Quân (12 years old) and Bảo Ngọc (7 years old), with musical theater singer Nguyễn Hương Thảo making first runner-up.

Season 2 (2012-13)

The second season of Vietnam's Got Talent started from 2 December 2012 with higher prize than the season 1 (~$24,000). In this season, the presenters in season 1 (Quyen Linh & Chi Bao) were replaced by Thanh Bach (the most popular MC in Vietnam nowadays).

Season 3 (2014-15)

The third season of Vietnam's Got Talent started from 28 September 2014 with one more judge Artist Hoài Linh and the new host Thanh Vân or Vân Hugo.

Season 4 (2016)

The fourth season started on 1 January 2016 and finished on 13 May 2016.

References

External links
List of television programmes broadcast by Vietnam Television (VTV)

Vietnam's Got Talent on Facebook page

 
Television series by Fremantle (company)
2010s Vietnamese television series
Vietnamese television series based on British television series